Try! is the first live album by the John Mayer Trio. It was recorded at the House of Blues, Chicago, Illinois and released by Columbia Records on November 22, 2005. The album was nominated for Best Rock Album at the 49th Annual Grammy Awards. The artwork for the album was done by Seattle graphic design firm, Ames Bros.

Production
The trio features John Mayer (guitar/lead vocals), Pino Palladino (bass), and Steve Jordan (drums/backup vocals). Unlike previous efforts by John Mayer, Try! focuses on popular blues renditions rather than adult-contemporary pop songs. The CD includes two cover songs, "Wait Until Tomorrow" by Jimi Hendrix, and "I Got a Woman" by Ray Charles; two of Mayer's previous album, Heavier Things' songs, "Daughters" and "Something's Missing"; and also showcased two songs from Mayer's then forthcoming album, Continuum, "Vultures" and "Gravity".

Reception

Critical response to the album was mixed, with most critics being impressed with Mayer's progression and Palladino and Jordan's musicianship, while still being underwhelmed. Christian Hoard of Rolling Stone said, "over most of these sixty-three minutes [of the album], Mayer proves he can bowl you over, not just make your knees weak", ultimately giving the album three out of five stars. Katy Hastey of Billboard found that "while "Try!" is brimming with talent, it's not consistently compelling." People magazine heartily praised the album, concluding, "Here's hoping Mayer keeps this new groove going for his next solo disc."

Track listing

Personnel

Musicians
John Mayer – vocals, guitar, production, art direction, graphic design
Steve Jordan – drums, backing vocals, production
Pino Palladino – bass, backing vocals
Chalmers Alford – guitar on track 11
Additional personnel
Ames Bros. – art direction, graphic design
Danny Clinch – photography
Michael Caulfield – photography

Production personnel
John Alagia – additional production
Roger Moutenot – Pro Tools engineering
Chris Nelson – additional engineering
Hardi Kamsani – additional engineering
Joel Singer – additional engineering
Peter Gary – additional engineering
Joe Ferla – mixing, recording on tracks 3 and 10
Chad Franscoviak – recording on all tracks except 3 and 10
Greg Calbi – mastering

Certifications

References

John Mayer live albums
Columbia Records albums
Live blues albums
2005 live albums